Mo Mengmeng (born 6 January 1995) is a Chinese handball player for Jiangsu and the Chinese national team.

She participated at the 2017 World Women's Handball Championship.

References

1982 births
Living people
Chinese female handball players